Daytona Bleach is the debut studio album by Canadian alt rock band MONOWHALES. It was released digitally and physically on March 5, 2021. "RWLYD (Really Wanna Let You Down)", the first single from the album, became the first song released by an independent, self-managed band to reach #2 on the Canadian Alternative Rock Charts. Subsequent singles "All or Nothing" and "Out With The Old" also charted in the Top 10.

Track listing

Personnel 
 Sally Shaar – vocals
 Zach Zanardo – guitar, bass guitar, keyboards, synthesizers, sound design, background vocals
 Jordan Circosta - drums, percussion, background vocals
 Holly Jamieson - synthesizers, background vocals

Charting History

References

2021 albums